Black Beast, The Black Beast may refer to: 

 Mario Roatta, World War II era Italian general
 Derrick Lewis (fighter), American MMA fighter
 Dark Beast, a Marvel Comics character and supervillain
 Kuroki Kemono, a BlazBlue non-player character
 Beast in Black, a Finnish-Greek-Hungarian heavy metal band